"The Good Ones" is a song recorded by American country music singer Gabby Barrett for her debut studio album, Goldmine (2020). Barrett co-wrote the song with Zach Kale, Emily Landis, and Jim McCormick, while Kale produced the track with Ross Copperman. "The Good Ones" was released to digital retailers and streaming services on July 12, 2019, as a promotional single and was serviced to American country radio on June 8, 2020, as the album's second official single. The song reached number one on the US Billboard Hot Country Songs chart and is certified 3× platinum.

Content
Barrett wrote "The Good Ones" in 2019 alongside Zach Kale, Emily Landis, and Jim McCormick. The song was inspired by Barrett's husband Cade Foehner and was intended to highlight positive relationships, in contrast to the type of story depicted in "I Hope". Lyrically, the song is a "nuanced ballad" that describes the type of man one would hope to marry.

Critical reception
Billy Dukes of Taste of Country praised the songwriting of "The Good Ones", writing that its lyricists crafted "the sort of song 19-year-olds aren't supposed to be able to write yet," and added that the song "promises to make a greater impact than ["I Hope"]." Chris Parton of Sounds Like Nashville wrote that the song features "soaring vocals and epic-feeling instrumentation." In a largely positive review for Goldmine, Brian Mansfield of Variety cited "The Good Ones" as one of the examples of the "big hooks and big emotions" that contribute to the album's success.

Commercial performance
"The Good Ones" peaked at number one on the Billboard Hot Country Songs chart, becoming Barrett's second consecutive number one single on that chart. The song also reached number one on the Country Airplay chart, where it spent three weeks at the top, marking the longest run at No. 1 for a female artist since Miranda Lambert's "The House That Built Me" in 2010. The song became a top 20 hit on the US Billboard Hot 100, peaking at 19. As of June 2022, "The Good Ones" has sold over 3,000,000 copies.

Music video
An accompanying music video directed by Brian Vaughan and Taylor Kelly premiered August 29, 2019. The video features Miss Wheelchair USA 2017, Madeline Delp, as a wheelchair-using bride-to-be dreaming of being able to stand and dance with her groom at her wedding. Throughout the video, scenes are shown of Delp's groom-to-be, played by Patrick Worstell, creating a harness to assist Delp with remaining on her feet. This culminates in the couple dancing together at their fictional wedding with the aid of Worstell's harness creation. Barrett wanted to use the video to showcase that "everyone's love story is going to be unique," while Delp has stated that the video draws on real life experience.

Charts

Weekly charts

Year-end charts

Certifications

Release history

References

2019 songs
2020 singles
Gabby Barrett songs
Warner Records Nashville singles
Songs written by Gabby Barrett
Songs written by Jim McCormick (songwriter)
Song recordings produced by Ross Copperman